Higginsius is a  genus of butterflies from north-eastern South America in the family Nymphalidae.

Species
Higginsius fasciata (Hopffer, 1874) – fasciata crescent (Peru, Ecuador, Colombia)
Higginsius miriam (Dognin, 1888) (Ecuador, Colombia)

References

Melitaeini
Nymphalidae of South America
Butterfly genera
Taxa named by Francis Hemming